Jonas Björkman and Todd Woodbridge were the defending champions, but did not participate this year.

Feliciano López and Fernando Verdasco won the title, defeating Wayne Arthurs and Paul Hanley 6–4, 6–4 in the final.

Seeds

Draw

Draw

References
Draw

2004 Stockholm Open
2004 ATP Tour